Lisitsyno is a rural locality (a village) in Gorkinskoye Rural Settlement, Kirzhachsky District, Vladimir Oblast, Russia. The population was 29 as of 2010. There are 13 streets.

Geography 
Lisitsyno is located on the Kirzhach River, 7 km north of Kirzhach (the district's administrative centre) by road. Ilkino is the nearest rural locality.

References 

Rural localities in Kirzhachsky District